The 1985 Winston 500 was a NASCAR Winston Cup Series racing event that took place on May 5, 1985, at Alabama International Motor Speedway in Talladega, Alabama as race number 9 of 28 of the 1985 NASCAR Winston Cup Series season.

Prior to this event, two-time Winston Cup champion Darrell Waltrip complained to NASCAR about how Bill Elliott was ruining the parity of the sport and he needed to be slowed down. As a result, NASCAR raised the height of the Ford vehicles by half an inch. The roof of the GM race cars was lowered by the same amount in order to improve their speed performance.

Background
Talladega Superspeedway, originally known as Alabama International Motor Superspeedway (AIMS), is a motorsports complex located north of Talladega, Alabama. It is located on the former Anniston Air Force Base in the small city of Lincoln. The track is a Tri-oval and was constructed by International Speedway Corporation, a business controlled by the France Family, in the 1960s. Talladega is most known for its steep banking and the unique location of the start/finish line - located just past the exit to pit road. The track currently hosts the NASCAR series such as the Sprint Cup Series, Xfinity Series, and the Camping World Truck Series.

Bill Elliott dominated the early part of the 1985 season, including winning the Daytona 500, the first race of the Winston Million promotion. The Winston 500 was the second. Later in the season at the Southern 500, Elliott would go on to become the first Winston Million winner.

Race report

More than 100,000 live spectators saw more than two and a half hours of racing with two cautions periods (lasting for only eight laps). This relatively clean race would see 28 different lead changes. Canadian driver Trevor Boys would finish in last place due to a problem with the engine on lap 6.  Bosco Lowe and Dick Skillen would exit NASCAR after this race while Geoff Bodine would lose the championship points lead to Terry Labonte. 

Some of the drivers were complaining (most notably Bobby Allison and Darrell Waltrip) about how it was difficult to draft off the back end of the '85 Thunderbird's in general and Elliott in specific. They commented that they felt the shape of the rear of the car was the reason why the average NASCAR driver found it difficult to draft off of Elliott. 

Early in the race, a broken oil fitting would put Elliott nearly two laps out of the lead before he managed a comeback. Elliott would return to the track and begin consistently running laps near 205 mph, making up the two laps lost without the aide of a yellow flag or the draft. 

The Ford Thunderbird's placed 1-2-3 with Kyle Petty beating Cale Yarborough in a photo finish for second place behind Elliott. The Ford trio were the only drivers to finish on the lead lap.

Full Results

Average speed: Pole speed: Attendance: 122,000

* - Includes 5 bonus points for leading at least 1 lap.** - Includes additional 5 bonus points for leading the most laps.

2 for 8 laps

Lead changes: 28

Failed to qualify

Standings after the race

References

Winston 500
Winston 500
NASCAR races at Talladega Superspeedway